Amelia Ellis (born 23 September 1977) is a British-German novelist and photographer best known for her mystery series featuring London private investigator Nea Fox.

Her themes include guilt and redemption, integrity, courage and sacrifice, but also friendship, love and various aspects of lesbian relationships. Urban loneliness is another major subject of her books.

Ellis' protagonist is a pensive but tough post-feminist woman in her early thirties searching for answers to life's persistent questions, often finding them in the course of her investigations.

Her novels contain elements of hardboiled fiction, cozies and classic detective stories and cannot easily be assigned to a specific genre of mysteries.

As a photographer, Ellis works primarily in the field of street photography. She is best known for her black and white pictures of London. Ellis is taking part in the London-based art project Camden17.

Work 
Nea Fox Series
 The Lion's Circle (2005)
 Lilies on Sand (2006)
 The Fourth Aspect (2008)
 The Pearl Dragon (2010)
 The Mirror of Muraro (2018)
Lambda Literary Award for Lesbian Mystery finalist

References

External links 
 Amelia Ellis Photography Website
 Nea Fox Series Website
 Bibliography
 Review of The Lion's Circle at Goodreads
 Review of Lilies on Sand at Goodreads

1977 births
Living people
English lesbian writers
German LGBT novelists
English LGBT novelists
English women novelists
21st-century British novelists
British mystery writers
Women mystery writers
Lesbian novelists
LGBT photographers
German women photographers
21st-century British women writers
British women photographers
German lesbian writers
21st-century LGBT people